Leuthard I of Paris (died before 28 December 815) was count of Paris and Fézensac.

He was the son of Gerard I of Paris and Rotrude. His brothers were the counts Stephen of Paris and Beggo of Paris.

Around 781, Leuthard was sent by Charlemagne to the duchy of Aquitaine where he stayed in the circle of Louis the Pious, king of Aquitaine (781-814) and emperor of the West (814-840).

Leuthard married Grimhilda (also known as Grimeut d'Alsace) with whom he had the following children:

 Engeltrude de Fézensac, wife of Odo of Orléans, and mother of Ermentrude of Orléans who married the future emperor Charles the Bald.
 Adalard the Seneschal (seneschal of the Carolingian empire under the reign of Louis the Pious)
 Girart de Roussillon (or Gerard II of Paris), count of Paris, Roussillon, and Vienne.

In 801, Leuthard followed Emperor Louis the Pious in his expedition to Spain and participated in the capture of Barcelona, for which he received the county of Fézensac in the duchy of Aquitaine, where he became the first count. In 809, he was probably involved in the siege of Tortosa.

According to historian René Poupardin, Leuthard ended his days in the county of Paris.

His son Girart de Roussillon succeeded him as count of Paris.

Counts of Paris
Counts of Fézensac
810s deaths
Year of birth missing
House of Girard
Nobility of the Carolingian Empire